The History of the United States of America 1801–1817, also known as The History of the United States of America During the Administrations of Thomas Jefferson and James Madison, is a nine-volume history written by American intellectual Henry Adams, and first published between 1889 and 1891. The entire work has been reprinted many times, most often in a two-volume format.  Historian Garry Wills has described it as "the greatest prose masterpiece of non-fiction in America in the 19th century." The critic and poet Dan Chiasson has also described the book's singular reputation, writing in The New Yorker, "To many, it is the greatest work of history written by an American." 

The first six chapters of the first volume have also been published separately as America in 1800.

References

External links
 archive.org
 Library of America
 onlinebooks.library.upenn.edu

1889 non-fiction books
1890 non-fiction books
1891 non-fiction books
History books about the United States
1800s in the United States
Series of history books
1810s in the United States